Sidalcea neomexicana is a species of flowering plant in the mallow family known by the common names salt spring checkerbloom, Rocky Mountain checker-mallow, and New Mexico checker.

Description
Sidalcea neomexicana  is a perennial herb growing from a cluster of fleshy roots, the mostly hairless stem growing 20 to 90 centimeters tall.

The fleshy leaves are sometimes divided shallowly to deeply into lobes.

The inflorescence is a loose cluster of flowers with pink petals up to 2 centimeters long.

Distribution and habitat
The plant is native to the Western United States and northern Mexico. It can be found in a diverse number of habitat types, including chaparral and coastal sage scrub, Yellow Pine Forest and riparian zones, Creosote bush scrub, and alkali flats and other salty substrates.

References

External links
USDA Plants Profile for Sidalcea neomexicana (salt spring checkerbloom)
Sidalcea neomexicana - UC Photos gallery

neomexicana
Flora of the Northwestern United States
Flora of the Southwestern United States
Flora of Northeastern Mexico
Flora of Northwestern Mexico
Flora of California
Flora of Baja California
Flora of Nebraska
Flora of New Mexico
Flora of Texas
Flora of the California desert regions
Natural history of the California chaparral and woodlands
Natural history of the Mojave Desert
Natural history of the Peninsular Ranges
Natural history of the Santa Monica Mountains
Natural history of the Transverse Ranges
Flora without expected TNC conservation status